Estádio da Madeira, formerly named Estadio Eng. Rui Alves and informally known as Estádio da Choupana is a football stadium in Funchal, Madeira, Portugal. It is primarily used as the home stadium for C.D. Nacional.

The stadium is currently able to hold 5,132 people and was built as a one-stand 2,500 seat stadium in 2000, when Nacional moved in. Previously they played their home games at the local municipal stadium, the Estádio dos Barreiros. The stadium is located within the Cidade Desportiva do C.D. Nacional, which also includes training pitches and a youth campus called Cristiano Ronaldo Campus Futebol, named in honour of Cristiano Ronaldo. The Sport City is located in the north of Funchal, high in the mountains of the Choupana district.

In January 2007, after a period of construction costing €20 million, the stadium was expanded to 5,132 by the opening of another stand. The stadium currently has only two all-seated stands which run the entire length of the pitch. The two ends of the field are occupied by tall fencing. On 1 June 2007 the stadium was renamed to Estádio da Madeira after the club reached an agreement with the local government to promote the region. The name also symbolises the fact that the stadium is the most modern sports venue on the island of Madeira, though not the biggest. That position is held by the municipal stadium, the Estádio dos Barreiros, home to Nacional's rivals Marítimo. Also in 2007, the academy campus was also renamed to Cristiano Ronaldo Campus Futebol.

References

External links
 
 Stadium pictures

Rui Alves
C.D. Nacional
C.F. União
Sport in Madeira
Buildings and structures in Madeira
Funchal
Sports venues completed in 1998